Charlestown Township may refer to:
 
Charlestown Township, Clark County, Indiana
Charlestown Township, Redwood County, Minnesota
Charlestown Township, Portage County, Ohio
Charlestown Township, Chester County, Pennsylvania

See also 

Charleston Township (disambiguation)

Township name disambiguation pages